In Hong Kong, public bus, public light bus (also known as green minibus) and residential bus routes bear their own route numbers.

Public buses 
The numbering systems of public buses can be classified into Hong Kong Island routes, Kowloon and New Territories routes, Lantau Island (New Lantao Bus) routes, MTR Bus routes, Cross harbour bus routes and Airport and North Lantau external bus routes. Their route numbering systems are independent. For example, there are both route 1, and route 2 on Hong Kong Island, Kowloon and Lantau Island respectively.

In the past, the air-conditioned bus routes were numbered as 200's (Kowloon and New Territories) and 500's (Hong Kong Island). However, this identification became void after they phased out all the non-aircon buses; and since then bus routes has been playing around with the old numbers.

At one time, there were two "N11" bus routes in Tung Chung, namely, Airport overnight route N11 and Lantau Island overnight route N11. The latter is no longer in service.

Public light buses 
The numbering systems of public light bus (green minibuses) are classified into Hong Kong Island public light bus routes, Kowloon public light bus routes and New Territories public light bus routes. There is one public light bus route operating in Airport or on Lantau Island (901). Their route numbering systems are independent too. However, for cross harbour public light bus routes, the route numbers from Hong Kong Island or New Territories are used instead.

Residential buses 
Residential bus routes are the routes which are requested to operate by the residents or estates community. At the past, the route numbers are with a suffix "R". The first residential bus route was route 88R from City One Shatin to Kowloon Tong station (it was then renumbered 62R). From c. 2003, the route numbers have been changed as prefix "HR", "KR", and "NR". They stand for Hong Kong Island residential bus routes, Kowloon residential bus routes and New Territories residential bus routes respectively. There is no residential bus services on Lantau Island (except Discovery Bay) and the Airport.

Route numbering system for public buses 
Note that xx represents numbers.

Hong Kong Island routes 
 2xx & 3xx: Recreational routes
 5xx: Existing air-conditioned bus routes (The rule was abolished when China Motor Bus ceased operations in 1998.)
 7xx: Island Eastern Corridor express routes

Kowloon & NT routes 
 xx: Existing bus routes operated by Kowloon Motor Bus, except routes 20 and 22 which are operated by Citybus.
 2xx: Existing air-conditioned bus routes as a rule before 2008. However, the rule was abolished with the phasing out of non-aircon buses.
 7xx: routes operated by NWFB
 8xx: Sha Tin Racecourse routes

Cross-harbour routes 
1xx: Cross-Harbour Tunnel routes
3xx: Peak-hour only cross-harbour routes (except for 307)
6xx: Eastern Harbour Crossing routes
9xx: Western Harbour Crossing routes

Alphabet prefix 
Prefix A: Airport deluxe bus routes
Prefix B: Border routes
Prefix DB: Discovery Bay Bus Service 
Prefix E: North Lantau external bus routes
Prefix H: New World First Bus Rickshaw Sightseeing Bus routes
Prefix K: MTR Bus (formerly KCR Feeder Bus) routes
Prefix M: Some bus routes that are terminated at an Airport Express station
Prefix N: Overnight bus routes
Prefix NA: Overnight Airport deluxe bus routes
Prefix P: City Direct bus services.
Prefix R: Recreational bus routes (for Hong Kong Disneyland / Marathon)
Prefix S: Airport shuttle bus routes
Prefix T: Special express routes for relieving rail services: T270, T277
Prefix W: Routes that terminates at West Kowloon Highspeed link station: W1
Prefix X: Express routes for special services
Prefix Y: Temporary route only in Typhoon (Y41)

Alphabet suffix 
Suffix A, B, C, D, E, F: Conventional routes
Suffix H: Hospital routes
Suffix K: Mainly connecting to East Rail line (formerly KCR East Rail) stations of MTR
Suffix M: Mainly connecting to the stations of Kwun Tong line, Island line, Tsuen Wan line and Tseung Kwan O line of MTR
Suffix P: Peak-hour only routes (except KMB 8P, 40P,276P, NWFB 8P, 796PCitybus A29P, Long Win Bus A41P and New Lantau Bus B2P, which are for whole day service)
Suffix R: Recreational bus routes
Suffix S: Peak-hour only routes or special services
Suffix X: Express services

Brief list 
Routes or route ranges marked italic indicates that the route (or all the routes in the range) have been canceled already.

See also 
Transport in Hong Kong
List of bus routes in Hong Kong

References

External links
www.16seats.net